The word decidable may refer to:

 Decidable language
Decidability (logic) for the equivalent in mathematical logic
Decidable problem and Undecidable problem
Gödel's incompleteness theorem, a theorem on the undecidability of languages consisting of "true statements" in mathematical logic.
 Recursive set, a "decidable set" in recursion theory

See also
 Decision problem
 List of undecidable problems
 Decision (disambiguation)
 Decide (disambiguation)